Émile Sacré was a French sailor and Olympic champion. Sacré competed at the 1900 Summer Olympics, where he won first prize in one of the two races in the 0-½ ton class. Sacré did not finish in the other race.

Further reading

References

External links
 
 
 

French male sailors (sport)
Sailors at the 1900 Summer Olympics – 0 to .5 ton
Sailors at the 1900 Summer Olympics – Open class
Olympic sailors of France
Olympic gold medalists for France
Year of birth missing
Year of death missing
Place of birth missing
Place of death missing
Olympic medalists in sailing